Maria Gladys Mello da Silva (born 23 November 1939), known as Maria Gladys, is a Brazilian actress.

Biography 
Gladys was born in the Cachambi neighborhood, in Rio de Janeiro, Brazil. At the age of three she contracted infantile paralysis and, at fifteen, became pregnant. She moved with her family to the Grajaú neighborhood, where her first son, Glayson, was born; his father was soon to disappear in the world. In the new neighborhood, Gladys knew Erasmo Carlos, Carlos Imperial, Tim Maia and Roberto Carlos, whom she began to date. It was at this time that Gladys became one of the official dancer of the program Clube do Rock, organized by Carlos Imperial.

In the late 1950s, Gladys decided to do theater and moved with the family to Copacabana, in the south zone of Rio. In 1959, she debuted with the play "O Mambembe" by Arthur Azevedo, in the Municipal Theater of Rio de Janeiro, next to Fernanda Montenegro, Fernando Torres, Sérgio Britto and Ítalo Rossi. At the same time, while studying to be an actress, Gladys became part of the company Teatro Jovem. In the publicity poster for the play O Chão dos Penitentes, she appeared with her breasts on display, being considered the first serious actress to show her body. In 1962, she starred in the play Sétimo Céu, set up by her friend Domingos de Oliveira.

Later, Gladys lived with Betty Faria and shared a house in Vidigal with Leila Diniz. Her mother had died and her father had gone back to the suburbs to raise his grandson. At that time, in 1964, she participated in Ruy Guerra's film "Os Fuzis", which won the Silver Bear in the Berlin Festival was indicated to the Golden Bear.

In TV she participated in important works like in Brilhante, Bandidos da Falange, As Noivas de Copacabana, Hilda Furacão, Um Anjo Caiu do Céu, A Lua Me Disse and Aquele Beijo. But undoubtedly one of her most emblematic characters was that of Lucimar da Silva in Vale Tudo.

In 2016 she played Dr. Elizabeth Tacanha in the TV Globo series Pé na Cova.

Filmography

Cinema

Television

References

External links 

1939 births
Living people
Actresses from Rio de Janeiro (city)
Brazilian television actresses
Brazilian film actresses
20th-century Brazilian actresses
21st-century Brazilian actresses